Angeles, officially the City of Angeles, is a 1st class highly urbanized city in the Central Luzon region of the Philippines. According to the 2020 census, it has a population of 462,928 people.

While Angeles City is politically independent from the province of Pampanga, it is usually grouped with it for statistical purposes.

Angeles City is one of the proposed metropolitan areas in the Philippines. Metro Angeles is proposed to include the component cities of Mabalacat and San Fernando, as well as the towns of Bacolor, Floridablanca, Guagua, Lubao, Mexico, Porac and Santa Rita.

Etymology
The name Ángeles is derived from the Spanish El Pueblo de los Ángeles ("The Town of the Angels") in honour of its patron saints, Los Santos Ángeles Custodios (Holy Guardian Angels), and the name of its founder, Don Ángel Pantaleón de Miranda.

History

Spanish period
In 1796, the gobernadorcillo or town head of San Fernando, Don Ángel Pantaleón de Miranda, and his wife, Doña Rosalía de Jesús, along with some followers, staked out a new settlement, which they named Culiát because of the abundance of vines (Gnetum indicum) of that name in the area. The new settlers cleared the woodland and cultivated the area for rice and sugar farming. Don Ángel built his first house with light materials at the northwest corner of the intersection of Sapang Balen and the road going towards the town of Porac. It was later donated to the Catholic Church and became a cemetery called "Campo Santong Matua" (today the site of Nepomuceno Coliseum).

On May 12, 1812, the new settlers tried to make Culiat a self-governing town but the friars resisted the move, led by Fray José Pometa. Ten years later, on February 11, 1822, Don Ángel filed a petition for the township of Culiat to secede from San Fernando, but it was denied. This was followed by another petition within the same year, jointly signed by Don Ángel, his son-in-law, Mariano Henson, and the latter's father, Severino Henson. He donated 35 hectares for the construction of the first Catholic church, a convent and a primary school while Doña Agustina Henson de Nepomuceno, the niece of who would become the first  of Angeles in 1830, Don Ciriaco de Miranda, gave land for the new public market. Don Ángel paid the complete amount required by law just for the secession of Culiat from San Fernando. There were only 160 taxpayers then but the law required that it should have at least 500 taxpayers.

The newly-autonomous town was renamed "" in honor of its patron saints, the Holy Angels, and the name of its founder, Don Ángel, coinciding with the rise of new barrios such as Santo Cristo (as the población or town proper), Cutcut, Pampang and Pulong Anunas. The progressive barrios developed some new industries like a sugar mill and a wine distillery. The transition of Angeles from a jungle clearing to a barrio, to a town and finally to a city took 168 years and in all that time, it survived locusts' infestations, wars, epidemics, volcanic eruptions and typhoons to become one of the fast rising towns in the country. When it received its first official municipal charter, the town contained some 661 people, 151 houses and an area of 38.65 km2.

On May 7, 1899, General Emilio Aguinaldo transferred the seat of the First Philippine Republic to Angeles. It then became the site of celebrations for the first anniversary of Philippine independence, which was proclaimed a year earlier in Kawit, Cavite. Events included a parade, led by the youngest ever Filipino generals, Gregorio del Pilar and Manuel Tinio, with General Aguinaldo viewing the proceedings from the Pamintuan Residence, which was the Presidential Palace from May to July 1899 (and later was the Central Bank of the Philippines office in Central Luzon, before its ownership passed to the National Historical Commission of the Philippines). Aguinaldo's sojourn was short, however, for in July of this same year he transferred his government to the province of Tarlac following Angeles' occupation by the American forces.

American period
On August 10, 1899, U.S. forces began the attack on Angeles confident in capturing it in a few days. However, the Filipino Army defending the town refused to give in so easily and fiercely fought back and for three months, they battled the Americans in and around the town. It was only after the battle on November 5, 1899, that the town finally fell into American hands. The Battle of Angeles was considered to be the longest in the history of the Filipino-American War in Pampanga. This led to the establishment of an American camp in Barrio Talimundoc (in what is now Lourdes Sur), located next to the railroad station, in order to establish control over the central plains of Luzon. In January 1900, General Frederick D. Grant organized the first U.S. Civil Government in Angeles by appointing an alcalde or municipal mayor, beginning American rule over Angeles.

In 1902, the United States Army studied relocating their post from Barrio Talimundoc to a fertile plain in Barrio Sapang Bato, which supposedly had better grass for their horses. It was centered on what would in later years become Clark Air Base's parade ground.

The Americans quickly commandeered Holy Rosary Parish Church and converted it into an army hospital, with the choir loft served as a dental clinic. The convento, which now houses Holy Family Academy, was the barracks for medical officers and enlisted men. The sacristy was the only portion where Angeleños could hear Mass. When the Americans finally vacated the church in 1904 and relocated to Fort Stotsenburg, parish priest Rev. Vicente Lapus listed a total of US$638 for portions of the church destroyed, looted church items and treasures, and arrears on rentals.

World War II
Hours after the attack on Pearl Harbor, Japan attacked the Philippines, targeting the American military presence, as well as the Philippine Army, and taking over the civilian government. During the Japanese occupation in the country, 57,000 Filipino and American prisoners of war passed the town of Angeles. They were forced to join the Bataan Death March, going to Camp O'Donnell in Capas, Tarlac. Angeleños showed their sympathy by handing them food, milk, boiled eggs, rice cakes, cigarettes, and water. Angeleños followed them up to the train station in Dau railway station in Mabalacat to give moral and spiritual support, and even helped the escapees.

War historians considered the bombing of Fort Stotsenburg on December 8, 1941, at 12:30 p.m. as one of the most destructive air raids in World War II, because almost all the American war planes were wrecked on the ground. In thirty minutes, the air might of America in the Far East was completely destroyed.

On the early morning of New Year's Day 1942, the first Japanese troops entered Angeles; they would occupy it until January 1945. During the Japanese invasion, another type of local government was set up on January 22, 1942. During the Japanese occupation, Clark Air Base then became a major center for staging Japanese air operations. Japanese aircraft flying out of Clark participated in the Battle of Leyte Gulf, considered to be the largest naval battle of the Second World War and possibly the largest naval battle in history.

Clark Air Base was recaptured by the Americans in January 1945, after three months of fierce fighting in the Philippines. After three years of atrocities committed by Japanese forces, the town and the rest of the Philippines were finally liberated by the combined United States and Philippine Commonwealth troops in 1945. The building of the general headquarters of the Philippine Commonwealth Army and Philippine Constabulary was situated in Angeles from January 1945 to June 1946, during and after World War II.

Independence and cityhood

After World War II, the Philippines gained independence from the United States on July 4, 1946, but then would be tied to a neo-colonial relationship. The "Treaty of General Relations" signed on independence day itself signified the Americans' withdrawal and surrender of possession, control and sovereignty over the Philippines, except the use of their bases. It was followed by the Philippine-American Military Bases Agreement on March 14, 1947, allowing the U.S. to maintain territorial integrity and sovereignty over Clark Air Base and Subic Naval Base for the next 44 years. Clark occupied 63,103 hectares and served as the tactical operational U.S. air force installation in the entire Southeast Asian region that had the capacity to accommodate the U.S. military transport planes, which served the entire Western Pacific.

Through the years, although Fort Stotsenburg continued to expand to become what is now known as Clark Air Base, Angeles, despite its proximity to the American camp, did not progress fast and remained fairly small until the end of World War II. It was finally inaugurated on January 1, 1964, as a chartered city under Republic Act No. 3700 and then it entered a period of tremendous growth that has resulted in its present position as the "Premier City in Central Luzon." It was then Mayor Rafael del Rosario's brainchild that Angeles became a city. He gained the distinction of being the last municipal mayor of Angeles. He was assisted in the preparation of the City Chapter by Attorney Enrique Tayag, a prominent resident of the town. Congresswoman Juanita L. Nepomuceno of the first district of Pampanga sponsored the bill in Congress, which was approved by then President Diosdado Macapagal, the ninth Philippine president and a native of the province of Pampanga.

Mount Pinatubo eruption and Angeles today

On June 15, 1991, Angeles was affected by the cataclysmic eruption of nearby Mount Pinatubo, with up to 60,000 people being evacuated from the city.  It was the second-largest volcanic eruption of the twentieth century and, by far, the largest eruption to affect a densely populated area.  The province of Pampanga, Clark specifically, were badly hit and the agricultural lands, as well as other businesses, were covered by tons of lahar. There were no casualties reported inside Clark two days from the initial eruption because the 18,000 personnel and their families were transported to Guam and the Subic Naval Base in Zambales.

The eruption of Mount Pinatubo forced the leadership of the U.S. to prematurely abandon its military installation at Clark Air Base. This is in addition to the voting by the Philippine Senate in 1991 to no longer extend the Laurel–Langley Agreement, which allowed the presence of U.S. military forces on Philippine territory, thus ending the long chapter of Filipino-American relations in the history of Angeles. The U.S. military never returned to Clark, turning over the damaged base to the Philippine government on November 26, 1991

In 1993, cleanup and removal of volcanic ash deposits began. The former base re-emerged as Clark Special Economic Zone (CSEZ) approved by then President Fidel V. Ramos on April 3 of the same year. The airfield infrastructure was improved and destined to be the premiere airport in the country in the next five years and one of the most modern in Asia. The creation of CSEZ has helped to offset the loss of income and jobs previously generated by the presence of the U.S. base.  Today, Angeles and Clark together form the hub for business, industry, aviation and tourism, as well as the entertainment and gaming center of Central Luzon.

Among the draws for tourists is the local dish sisig which according to the Center for Kapampangan Studies, originated in this Angeles and has been on the menu since the 1730s. Pampanga is well known as the culinary center of the Philippines.

In 2018, Angeles applied to be a UNESCO Creative City, while it also applied sisig into the UNESCO List of Intangible Cultural Heritage. The applications are currently being processed by UNESCO.

Geography 
It is bordered by Mabalacat to the north, Mexico to the east, San Fernando to the southeast, Bacolor to the south, and Porac to the southwest and west. Though the city administers itself autonomously from Pampanga, it is the province's commercial and financial hub.

Angeles is served by Clark International Airport in Clark Freeport Zone.

Climate

Under the Köppen climate classification system, Angeles has a tropical savanna climate that borders on a tropical monsoon climate (Köppen climate classification Aw/Am).
Angeles experiences two distinct seasons: a dry season from November through April, with a wet season from May through October. From 1953 to 1991, the mean daily low was 22.6 °C and the mean daily high was 31.3 °C, with June being warmest and January and February being the coolest. The average annual rainfall is 2026.8 mm.  Typhoons tend to approach from the east during the summer and fall.  Many damaging storms struck the city, including Typhoon Irma on November 28, 1974 (generally considered to be the strongest one); Typhoon Rita on October 27, 1978; Typhoon Irma (the name was reused) on November 24, 1981; Typhoon Ruby on October 25, 1988; and Typhoon Yunya on June 15, 1991, which coincided with the Mount Pinatubo blast. In July 1972, Central Luzon experienced a month of nearly continuous rain, resulting in ± falling on the plain around Angeles.

Barangays
Angeles is divided into 33 barangays.

Anunas

Anunas is the barangay that houses the city's Koreatown, a chain of Korean establishments along the Fil-Am Friendship Highway. Anunas is also identified as one of the growth centers of the city, focusing on light industries such as woodcarving and rattan craft.

Balibago and Malabañas

Balibago is the main entertainment district of Angeles. It contains Casino Filipino Angeles and the famous Fields Avenue tourist belt. The city's biggest mall, SM City Clark, is also situated in Barangay Malabañas.

Pampang and San Nicolas
These two barangays form the main public market district of the city. The Pampang Wet Market, San Nicolas Market, Friday Flea Market (locally referred to as Apu), Jumbo Jenra Angeles, Puregold Angeles, and the Angeles Slaughterhouse are found here. The Pampang Wet Market is the largest and most frequented wet market in the province of Pampanga. It also attracts people from nearby towns. Ospital Ning Angeles (ONA),City College of Angeles, Angeles City National High School are located in Pampang.

Pulung Maragul

Pulung Maragul is the barangay that houses the city's government complex, which includes the Angeles City Hall, the Angeles City Hall of Justice, and other government buildings. It is also the location of the Angeles Exit of the North Luzon Expressway and Marquee Mall, Ayala's first mall in Central Luzon. Marquee Place and Marquee Residences later rose in Pulung Maragul as well, next to the mall.

Santo Rosario
Santo Rosario is the poblacion. It is home to most of Angeles' heritage and historical structures such as the Holy Rosary Parish Church, Pamintuan Mansion which is privately owned by Maverick Pamintuan, Bale Herencia, and Museo ning Angeles (former City Hall building). Holy Angel University, Central Luzon's largest university in terms of population, is also located here. Plans of declaring the barangay or parts of it a heritage zone are ongoing.

Sapangbato
Sapangbato is the largest barangay in Angeles in terms of territory, with a total land area of 104,694 sq. meters and a population of 11,262. Located northwest of Angeles near Clark Freeport Zone, it is identified as the barangay in Angeles with the highest elevation of 750 feet above sea level. It is home to Fort Stotsenburg, also known as the Parade Grounds of Clark. apl.de.ap, member of the hip hop group The Black Eyed Peas, hails from Sapangbato. The famous Puning Hot Springs of Barangay Inararo in Porac are accessed through Sitio Target in Sapangbato.

Demographics
Kapampangan is the predominant language of the city, along with Tagalog. English is also widely spoken, and understood by those with or without American military fathers.

Religion
The majority of the population of Angeles is Catholic. At least two major festivals associated with the Catholic faith are held in October in the city. Commemorating the victory of the Spanish fleet over the Dutch Navy in 1646, the La Naval Fiesta is celebrated in honor of the Our Lady of La Naval de Manila with adherents believing that her intercession was instrumental to the Spaniards' naval victory. The Apu Fiesta involves devotees from all over Pampanga making a visit to the Apu shrine to venerate the image of Jesus Christ lying in the sepulchre which is believed to be miraculous by believers.

Expatriate and immigrant community 
Owing to the presence of the nearby U.S. Clark Air Force Base and consequent Freeport Zone, many Americans chose to permanently settle in the area, particularly in the Balibago district, and thus Angeles became home to a large colony of expatriates. During the American colonial period (1898–1946), more than 800,000 Americans were born in the Philippines, and a large concentration of Filipino mestizos or Filipinos with American ancestry were located in this city.

Economy 

Being home of the former Clark Air Base (once the largest United States military facility outside the continental United States), it was significantly affected by the fallout from the eruption of Mount Pinatubo in 1991. The economy of Angeles was heavily dependent on the American base at that time.

In 1993, a full cleanup and removal of volcanic ash deposits began and the former U.S. base was transformed into the Clark Special Economic Zone (CSEZ). The creation of CSEZ has helped to offset the loss of income and jobs previously generated by the presence of the U.S. base in the city. Today, Angeles and Clark form the hub for business, industry, aviation, and tourism in the Philippines as well as a leisure, fitness, entertainment and gaming center of Central Luzon.

Angeles is home to an emerging technology industry. Its economy is based also on tourism and gambling. Fields Avenue forms the hub of the night life industry focused in Angeles. With close proximity to an international airport in Clark Freeport, Angeles is visited by foreigners all year round.

In the 2000s, the local government of Angeles rebranded the Fields Avenue tourist belt as a high-end destination with fine restaurants and luxury hotels and casinos The finishing of roads, such as the Subic–Clark–Tarlac Expressway, has improved trade and transport. The project connects the industrial, transport and business hubs of Pampanga, Zambales, Bataan and Tarlac. The project is crucial to bolstering growth in Central Luzon.

The city has cottage industries producing rattan furniture, coconuts, and charcoal briquettes.  It also has many thriving export businesses in handicrafts, metal crafts, toys, houseware and garments. Apart from the Clark Freeport Zone, industrial areas include the Angeles Livelihood Village and the Angeles City Industrial Estate.

Call centers present are e-Telecare, CyberCity, Sutherland and IRMC. Other American IT industries are major employers as well. The establishment of a number of shopping malls also fueled the city's economy, including SM City Clark, Robinsons Angeles, Jenra Grand Mall, Nepo Mall, Saver's Mall and the Marquee Mall, next to City Hall.

Angeles City houses numerous restaurants that are usually located near the malls and mostly in Nepo Quad which was newly renovated to cater the heightened needs of the population.

Culture

The city hosts a street party called the Tigtigan Terakan keng Dalan every October which features musical performances from both amateur and better-known OPM bands.

The Sisig Festival, locally known as the Sadsaran Qng Angeles, festivities dedicated to the Kapmpangan dish sisig, used to be held every December. It was halted in 2008 following the murder of Lucia Cunanan, who was known for promoting the dish. The festival was revived as a one-day fiesta in April 2017 in association with the Department of Tourism.

Tourism

Angeles is promoted as a gastronomy tourist destination and is billed as the "culinary capital" of the Philippines. The city is known as a hub for Kampampangan cuisine as well as for its pork sisig. The city also has numerous historically and culturally significant tourist destinations including the Pamintuan Mansion, a heritage house which hosts a history and social studies museum, and the Holy Rosary Church, which is recognized by the National Museum of the Philippines as an Important Cultural Property. Angeles is also situated within the perimeter of the Clark Freeport Zone.

Sex tourism
A consequence of the presence of U.S. bases in the country is the prostitution industry in the city. Since the early days of Clark Air Base, Fields Avenue in Balibago district is an area frequently visited by the U.S. servicemen, has been known as a center for prostitution and sex tourism.
A BBC article characterized it as "the centre of the Philippines sex industry" and dubbed it "Sin City."
Elsewhere and in later years, Philippine travel publications have described it as the "Entertainment Capital of Central Luzon", "The Filipino Las Vegas", and "Entertainment City."

Government

List of Mayors

Gobernadorcillo or Capitan

1829–1830, Ciriaco de Miranda
1831, Alejandro Pamintuan
1832, Nicolas de Guzman
1833, Felipe Mendiola
1834, Nicolas Navarro
1835, Pantaleon Paras
1836, Victoriano Morales
1837, Mariano Tolentino
1838, Tiburcio Paras
1839, Vicente Feliciano
1840, Pedro Arceo
1841, Alejandro Pamintuan
1842, Eulogio Tadeo
1843, Cristobal Lacson
1844, Nicolas de Guzman
1845, Doroteo Dison
1846, Esteban Datu
1847, Jose Maria Henson
1848, Nicolas Navarro
1849, Mauricio de Jesus
1850, Eulogio Tadeo
1851, Casimiro Sanchez
1852, Pio R. Nepomuceno
1853–1854, Pablo del Rosario
1855, Victor Lacson
1856, Jose Narciso
1857, Valentin Tuazon
1858, Pedro Tanjueco
1859, Carlos Cayanan
1860, Cesareo Dison
1861, Perfecto Paris
1862, Tomas Dison
1863, Pedro Sanchez
1864, Victor Lacson
1865, Agustin Dison
1866, Jose Narciso
1867, Macario Dison
1868, Mariano Suarez
1869, Filomeno Pamintuan
1869–1871, Laureano Lacson
1871, Mariano V. Henson
1873, Francisco Paris
1875, Mariano Pamintuan
1877, Eduardo Tison
1879, Juan Nepomuceno
1881, Simplicio Mendiola
1882, Juan de Guzman
1888, Vicente Paras
1885, Maximo Tablante
1887, Jose R. Henson
1889, Aniceto Gueco
1891, Laureano Suarez
1893, Catalino de los Santos

Capitan Municipal

1894, Catalino de los Santos
1895, Mariano Paras
1896, Clemente Gueco

Committee

June 1, 1898, Filomeno Pamintuan, Teofisto Ganson, Galicano Valdes

Presidente Municipal

September 1898, Juan Nepomuceno
1899, Laureano Lacson
1900, Galicano Valdes
1900, Pablo Torres

Alcalde

1900, Florentino Pamintuan
1901, Laureano Suarez

Municipal President

1901, Laureano Suarez
1902, Esteban Gomez
1904, Marcelo Mesina
1904, Lauro Dison
1906, Leandro Panlilio
1908, Jose P. Henson
1910, Galicano Valdes
1913, Demetrio Gomez
1916, Emiliano Valdes
1919, Clemente N. Dayrit
1922, Juan D. Nepomuceno
1928, Ricardo Nepomuceno
1931, Francisco Lazatin

Municipal Mayor

1936, Francisco Lazatin
1937, Clemente N. Dayrit
1941, Agapito del Rosario
1942, Clemente N. Dayrit
1944, Miguel Malig
1944, Ponciano Dayrit
1945, Alberto Sicangco
1945, Ricardo Canlas
1946, Rafael Lazatin
1947, Vicente N. Henson
1947–1951, Jose Pangilinan
October 8–November 5, 1951, Mariano A. Henson
1952–1959, Manuel Abad Santos
1960–1963, Rafael S. del Rosario

City Mayor

1964–1967, Rafael S. del Rosario
1968–1971, Eugenio N. Suarez
1972–1979, Rafael L. Lazatin
1980–1987, Francisco G. Nepomuceno
1988–1992, Antonio A. Abad Santos
1992–1998, Edgardo D. Pamintuan
March 7–June 30, 1998, Maximo L. Sangil
July 1, 1998–2007, Carmelo F. Lazatin
2007-2010, Francis L. Nepomuceno
2010–2019, Edgardo D. Pamintuan
2019–present, Carmelo G. Lazatin Jr.

Education

Colleges and universities

Media
In Angeles City, the only TV channel is PEP TV via Air Cable Channel 3 SD & 209 in HD. There are three radio stations in the city; they are UFM 105.5, GVAM 792 and GV 99.1.

Transport
Clark International Airport is near the city; it is served by many passenger and cargo airlines, including some international ones.

Notable residents

Sister cities
Angeles has the following sister cities:

 Las Vegas, Nevada, U.S.
 Seo District, Daegu, South Korea
 Davao City, Philippines
 Cabanatuan, Philippines
 San Fernando, Pampanga, Philippines
 Valenzuela, Philippines
 General Santos, Philippines

References

External links

 
 [ Philippine Standard Geographic Code]
Philippine Census Information
Local Governance Performance Management System
Interactive street map of Angeles City area

 
Cities in Pampanga
Highly urbanized cities in the Philippines
Populated places established in 1829
1829 establishments in the Philippines